Annaïg Le Meur (born 29 April 1973) is a French politician representing La République En Marche! (LREM) who was elected to the French National Assembly on 18 June 2017, representing Finistère's 1st constituency.

Political career
In parliament, Le Meur serves on the Committee on Economic Affairs. In addition to her committee assignments, she is a member of the French-Kuwaiti Parliamentary Friendship Group.

Political positions
In July 2019, Le Meur voted in favor of the French ratification of the European Union’s Comprehensive Economic and Trade Agreement (CETA) with Canada.

See also
 2017 French legislative election

References

1973 births
Living people
Politicians from Brest, France
La République En Marche! politicians
Deputies of the 15th National Assembly of the French Fifth Republic
21st-century French women politicians
Women members of the National Assembly (France)
Deputies of the 16th National Assembly of the French Fifth Republic